John Bligh Conway (born September 22, 1939) is an American mathematician.  He is currently a professor emeritus at the George Washington University. His specialty is functional analysis, particularly bounded operators on a Hilbert space.

Conway earned his B.S. from Loyola University and Ph.D. from Louisiana State University under the direction of Heron Collins in 1965, with a dissertation on The Strict Topology and Compactness in the Space of Measures. He has had 20 students who obtained doctorates under his supervision, most of them at Indiana University, where he was a close friend of mathematician Max Zorn. He served on the faculty there from 1965 to 1990, when he became head of the mathematics department at the University of Tennessee.

He is the author of a two-volume series on Functions of One Complex Variable (Springer-Verlag), which is a standard graduate text.

Selected publications

References

External links

1939 births
20th-century American mathematicians
21st-century American mathematicians
Functional analysts
George Washington University faculty
Living people
Louisiana State University alumni
Mathematical analysts
Mathematicians from Louisiana
Scientists from New Orleans